Welkin Weasels is a series of fantasy novels by British author Garry Kilworth. As of 2003, it consists of six  books, all published by Random House's Corgi Juvenile imprint.

Series

Thunder Oak

Years after all the humans mysteriously vanished from the island of Welkin, a group of outlaw weasels set out to find them in hopes of restoring the crumbling sea walls that surround the island.

Castle Storm

Following the clue found in Thunder Oak, the weasels journey to a city inhabited by quarreling squirrels.

Windjammer Run

Sylver and his outlaws set sail for the Island of Dorma, where the humans are reputed to be in a perpetual sleep.

Gaslight Geezers

Years after the return of the humans, the weasel detective Montegu Sylver attempts to solve the disappearance of a foreign dignitary while preventing his cousin from setting off explosives in the city.

Vampire Voles

Monty and his friends battle the swarms of vampiric voles invading the capital city.

Heastward Ho!

Monty and friends travel to the eastern empire of Far Kathay to find the stolen jade shoes of the Green Idol of Ommm.

Prominent Characters

Medieval Era

Weasels
Sylver – The leader of the outlaw weasels.
Mawk – A cowardly member of the outlaws
Scirf – A scruffy but intelligent male outlaw.
Icham – Sylver's closest friend and fellow outlaw
Bryony – A female outlaw with a close relationship with Sylver
Miniver – An undersized but resourceful female weasel
Wodehed – An old magician whose spells go wrong more often than not
Dredless – A male outlaw who is the most dangerous with darts or slingshot
Luke- The holy male weasel of the outlaws
Alysoun- A jill (female) outlaw who is the fastest runner in Halfmoon Wood.

Stoats
Prince Poynt – The spoiled and childish ruler of Welkin
Princess Sibiline – Poynt's smug but friendly sister
Sheriff Falshed – The high sheriff of Welkin
Lord Flaggatis – A sorcerer seeking control of Welkin
Lord Haukin – A kindly but forgetful old stoat

Victorian Era

Weasels
Montegu "Monty" Sylver –
Bryony Bludd
Scruff –
Maudlin –
Spindrick Sylver – Monty's cousin, an infamous anarchist with a penchant for destroying things

Stoats
Jeremy Poynt – The Mayor of Muggidrear
Sybil Poynt –
Zacharias Falshed – The Chief of Police in Muggidrear
Hannover Haukin –

Universe

Animals
The animals featuring in the series are primarily species native to England, though more exotic species are occasionally mentioned. The first book explains that in the years following the disappearance of all humans, the animals of Welkin, both those wild and once domesticated, made their way into the abandoned castles and villages, using what the humans had left behind.
Gradually the animals learned to speak human language and, to an extent, use human tools. While some of the animals were content to live in the forest, the mustelids in particular adapted to a more civilized way of living.
The otters and mink took to the riverways; the badgers kept to the subterranean territories; the pine martens stayed in the trees; of the remaining weasels, stoats, and now-feral ferrets, the stoats were the most ambitious and aggressive, and took control of Welkin.

Common Terms
Titles – The weasels and stoats use the terms jack and jill to refer to males and females, respectively. In the second arc, the shortened forms Jal and Jis are used in the same way humans use the titles Mr. and Mrs.
Hollyhockers – A popular form of gambling involving seeds thrown onto a surface in various patterns

Important Locations

Medieval Era
Halfmoon Wood – The forest where Sylver and his bandits live
Castle Rayn – Prince Poynt's castle, once inhabited by the humans
The unnamed marshes – The land of the rats, ruled over by the mad stoat Flaggatis.

Victorian Era
Muggidrear – The capital city of Welkin. It is split in half by the river Bronn. The south side is occupied by the humans, and the north is occupied by the animals.
Whistleminster Palace – The castle where queen Amarjit Nandhra Ilford lives and where the royal family lives

Living Statues
The island of Welkin is populated not only by animals, but statues created by humans that have since come to life. The statues have the ability to talk, but most do so rather poorly and have only limited intelligence. All statues wander Welkin constantly in search of their "First and Last Resting Place," that being the quarry from which the stones they were sculpted from were cut, or the forest from which the trees used to carve them were grown.

Magic

Technology

Thematic Elements

The comedic elements of the series rely heavily on the use of puns and literary references, including allusions to Shakespearean and Biblical stories.

See also

Garry Kilworth

External links
 Official website of Garry Kilworth

Fantasy novel series
Fictional weasels
Fictional ferrets
Children's novels about animals
Series of children's books